Shahrak-e Askan Ashayir or Shahrak-e Askan Ashayr may refer to:
 Shahrak-e Askan Ashayir, Behbahan
 Shahrak-e Askan Ashayr, Shushtar